Willow Creek Pass may refer to:

Willow Creek Pass (Colorado)
Willow Creek Pass (Montana)
Willow Creek Summit, a mountain pass in Idaho